The Bichir family is a Mexican family of actors of Lebanese origin.

They include:
 Alejandro Bichir, husband of Maricruz
 Maricruz Nájera, wife of Alejandro
 Bruno Bichir, son of Maricruz and Alejandro
 Demián Bichir, son of Maricruz and Alejandro
 Odiseo Bichir, son of Maricruz and Alejandro

References

Mexican families